The Chevrolet Chevelle  is a mid-sized automobile that was produced by Chevrolet in three generations for the 1964 through 1978 model years. Part of the General Motors (GM) A-body platform, the Chevelle was one of Chevrolet's most successful nameplates. Body styles included coupes, sedans, convertibles, and station wagons. The "Super Sport" versions were produced through the 1973 model year and Lagunas from 1973 through to 1976.

After a four-year absence, the El Camino was reintroduced as part of the new Chevelle lineup in 1964.

The G-body Monte Carlo, introduced in 1970, also used a platform that was based heavily on the Chevelle platform, although it was lengthened ahead of the firewall.

From 1964 through 1969, GM of Canada sold a modified version of the Chevelle that included a Pontiac-style grille and a LeMans instrument panel, marketed as the Beaumont.

The Malibu was the top-of-the-line model through 1972 and completely replaced the Chevelle nameplate starting with the redesigned and downsized 1978 model year.

First generation (1964–1967)

Overview
The automobile marketplace was changing significantly during the early 1960s and became competitive in the smaller-sized car segments. The domestic Big Three automakers (General Motors, Ford, and Chrysler) were responding to the success of American Motors' compact Rambler American and Classic models that made AMC the leading maker of small cars for several years and increasing Rambler on the 1961 domestic sales charts to third-place behind Chevrolet and Ford. The innovative Chevrolet Corvair and the Chevy II, which was designed to compete with Ford's Falcon, were losing ground. Ford released the mid-sized Fairlane in 1962, to which Chevrolet responded with the 1964 Chevelle based on a new A platform design. Built on a  wheelbase, the new Chevelle was similar in size, simplicity, and concept to what were classified as the "standard-sized" 1955–1957 Chevrolet models. The Chevelle was the U.S. auto industry's only all-new car for 1964 and was positioned to fill the gap between the small Chevy II and the full-sized Chevrolet models. Introduced in August 1963 by "Bunkie" Knudsen, the Chevelle filled the gap in market coverage for Chevrolet and achieved sales of 338,286 for the year.

Originally conceived as an upsizing of the Chevy II with a unibody platform (similar to the Fairlane and the full-size Chrysler B-platform of the same era) which originated with the XP-726 program, GM's "senior compact" A-platform used a body-on-frame construction using a suspension setup similar to its full-sized automobiles with a four-link rear suspension (the axle has four control arms which are attached to the frame with rear coil springs sandwiched between the axle and spring pocket—this design was used with the B platform vehicles). The name "chevelle" has been speculated as influenced by gazelle and Chevrolet combined, as a smaller sedan to the Impala.

Two-door hardtop coupes, and convertibles, four-door sedans, and four-door station wagons were offered throughout the entire run. This also included a coupe utility (El Camino) which was a derivative of the two-door wagon. In line with other Chevrolet series, the two-door hardtops were called Sport coupes. Four-door hardtops, dubbed Sport Sedans, were available (1966 through 1972). A two-door sedan and station wagon was available in 1964 and 1965 in the base 300 series. These economy-focused models included a simulated floor carpet made of vinyl-coated rubber color-matched to four available interior colors. The station wagons were marketed with exclusive nameplates: Greenbrier (previously used with the Corvair based vans), Concours, and Concours Estate. Two six-cylinder engines and several V8s were offered in every model.

Chevelles were also assembled and sold in Canada. While similar to their stateside counterparts, the convertible was available in the base Chevelle series, a model never offered in the United States. The Chevelle was the basis for the Beaumont, a retrimmed model sold only in Canada by Pontiac dealers through 1969.

Chevelle SS

The Chevelle Super Sport, or SS, represented Chevrolet's entry into the muscle car battle. In early 1964 and 1965, Chevelles had a Malibu SS badge on the rear quarter panel. Chevelles with the mid-1965 Z-16 option, priced at US$1,501 in 1965, had the emblem on the front fender as well as distinct in-house style numbers: 737 for the hardtop and 767 for the convertible. 
The $162 Super Sport package was available on the upscale Malibu two-door hardtop and convertible models; the option added special exterior brightwork with SS emblems and the 14-inch full-disc wheel covers from the Impala SS. Inside, the vinyl bucket-seat interior featured a floor console for models equipped with the optional Muncie aluminum four-speed manual or Powerglide two-speed automatic instead of the standard three-speed manual. Malibu SS also came with a four-gauge cluster in place of engine warning lights, and a dash-mounted tachometer was optional.

Both used a four-barrel carburetor and 10.5:1 compression. For 1965, Chevrolet also added the 350-hp 327 V8 as a Regular Production Option (RPO) L79. 
A total of 294,160 Chevelles were built in the first year, including 76,860 SS models. After 1965, the Malibu SS badge disappeared except for those sold in Canada. A limited 201 Malibu SS 396 'Z-16' big-block-equipped cars were also eventually produced starting in late 1965, with most being built between mid-March and mid-April.

The Chevelle SS 396 became a series of its own in 1966 with series/style numbers 13817 and 13867.
SS396 sport coupes and convertibles used the same Malibu sport coupe and convertible bodies with reinforced frames and revised front suspension: higher-rate springs, recalibrated shocks, and thicker front stabilizer bar, but with different exterior trim. They also had simulated hood scoops, red-stripe tires, and bright trim moldings. The SS 396 series lasted from 1966 through 1968 before being relegated to an option package in 1969. The 1966 and 1967 model years were the only two years of the 'strut back' 2-door sport coupe with its own style number, 17.

In Canada, sporty Chevelles continued to wear "Malibu SS" badges for the 1966 and early 1967 model years. These Chevelles were available with the same equipment as non-SS Malibu models in the U.S. and did not get the domed hood or the blackout front and rear treatment. Redline tires were not available on Canadian Chevelles in 1966. A 1966 Malibu SS factory photo shows wheel covers on the car from the 1965 Impala. The Canadian Malibu SS got its "SS" name from the "Sports Option" package under RPO A51 and was primarily a trim option. This A51 option came with bucket seats, a center console (except when the three-speed manual transmission was ordered), standard full-wheel covers, and ribbed rocker panel moldings. The "Malibu SS" emblems were carried over from the 1965 Malibu SS series. This Canadian option could be ordered with any six-cylinder or V8 engine available at the time. Starting in January 1967, the Chevelle SS396 took over and became its own 138xx series, the same as in the U.S. Produced at the Oshawa, Ontario production facility, only 867 SS 396 models were produced during 1967.

Z-16 SS 396
Only 200 regular production 1965 Z-16 Chevelles were built at the Kansas City plant. The Z-16 option included the convertible boxed frame, a narrowed rear axle and brake assemblies from the contemporary Impala, heavy-duty suspension, plus virtually all Chevelle comfort and convenience options. The Z-16 standard big-block 396 Turbo-Jet V8 (fitted with hydraulic lifters instead of the solid lifters of the same motor used in the Corvette) came only with the Muncie wide-ratio four-speed manual transmission. The rear panel of the Z-16 had unique black and chrome trim which framed untrimmed Chevelle 300-style taillights (Malibu and Malibu SS models had bright silver-painted lens trim).

The prototype Z-16 Chevelle was built at the Baltimore plant. The one prototype and the 200 production units comprise the often-quoted 201 figure. All were two-door hardtops. One convertible was reportedly specially built for Chevy General Manager Knudsen, but is understood to have been destroyed. Approximately 75 Z-16s are presently accounted for.

New body 1966–1967
1966 saw a complete restyle of the Chevelle on the previous frame that included smooth contours, a broad new grille, and bumper treatment as well as curved side windows. Bulging rear fender lines and a "flying buttress" roofline (tunneled into the "C" pillar) were highlights of the 1966 hardtops, shared with other GM "A" body models. The new body reflected the "Coke bottle" body shape that became the fad for American cars in the mid-1960s. A 4-door hardtop-styled Sport Sedan joined the Malibu series. It was an attractive car and was offered through 1972, but never achieved the high-production figures as the pillared sedan. Chevelles continued in 300, 300 Deluxe, and Malibu trims. Available engines were a 327-cubic-inch V8 instead of either of the sixes, or the mid-level option, a 220-horsepower 283-cubic-inch V8. Options included a tachometer, mag-style wheel covers, and sintered-metallic brakes, four-way power seats, a tissue dispenser, and cruise control.

The 1967 models received a facelift. Large wraparound taillamps went into a new rear end with standard backup lights. "What you'll see inside," claimed the sales brochure for the 1967 Chevelle, "will probably bring on a severe compulsion to go driving." Front disc brakes were available on all models, and a new dual master cylinder brake system incorporated a warning light. Chevrolet also added 14-inch wheels and a three-speed automatic transmission to their line of transmissions. New safety equipment became standard, including a collapsible steering column. The SS396 continued as its own series with both sport coupe and convertible body styles. The 375-horsepower 396-cubic-inch V8 was dropped from the options list until late in the model year and returned with 612 being sold. Seven transmissions were available: two manual three-speeds, two manual four-speeds, an overdrive three-speed, and two automatics. The manual-shift feature of the Turbo Hydra-Matic transmission was featured. Options included Superlift air shock absorbers, Strato-ease headrests, and special instrumentation.

Second generation (1968–1972)

Overview
The 1968 Chevelle received an all-new distinctly sculpted body with tapered front fenders and a rounded beltline. The car adopted a long-hood/short-deck profile with a high rear-quarter "kick-up". While all 1967 Chevelle models rode a  wheelbase, the 1968 coupes and convertibles now rode a  wheelbase. The 4 door sedans and wagons turned to a  span. Tread width grew an inch front and rear. Hardtop coupes featured a semi-fastback, flowing roofline with a long hood and short deck, influenced by the all-new Camaro. The fastback appearance was a revival of a streamlining bodystyle on all GM products from 1942 until 1950, as demonstrated on the Chevrolet Fleetline. Top-trim models (including the SS 396 and new luxury Concours) featured GM's new Hide-A-Way wiper system. Lesser Chevelles would get that change later.

The entry-level Chevelle 300 (131 - 132 VIN prefix) was available as a pillared coupe and/or station wagon (Nomad) while the 300 Deluxe and Nomad Custom (133 or 134 VIN prefix) had a 2-door hardtop added to the lineup (fourth and fifth VIN characters will be 37; with the previous 300 Deluxe the hardtop was available with the Malibu and SS396 but not the base 300/Deluxe in the USA not counting those produced for the Canadian market). The Super Sport (SS396 sport coupe, convertible, and El Camino pickup) became a series on its own. Chevrolet produced 60,499 SS 396 sport coupes, 2,286 convertibles, and 5,190 El Caminos; 1968 was the only year the El Camino body style would get its own SS396 series designation (13880).

Government-mandated side marker lighting was incorporated, with early 1968 SS 396 light bezels seen with the SS 396 nomenclature - at some point in the later production cycle the engine callout had a 396 also shared with the Chevy II Nova SS (the side marker bezels, also sourced from the Chevy II Nova in 307, 327, and 396 displacements) had the engine displacement except for the six-cylinder models). Black-accented Super Sports had F70x14 red-stripe tires and a standard 325-horsepower 396-cubic-inch Turbo-Jet V8 engine with the special twin-domed hood; 350 and 375-horsepower 396 engines were optional. The SS 396 sport coupe started at $2,899 - or $236 more than a comparable Malibu with its 307-cubic-inch V8. All-vinyl bucket seats and a console were optional. Three luxury Concours options became available in March 1968 for the 4-door sedan, the 4-door sport sedan (and the hardtop coupe) and consisted of special sound insulation, and a deep-padded instrument panel with simulated woodgrain accents and all-vinyl color-keyed interiors. Interiors were sourced and shared with select Buick, Oldsmobile, or Pontiac A body patterns - during the middle of the 1968 model year, some Chevrolet A-bodies (including the El Camino) ended up with interior door panels shared with the Buick or Oldsmobile A bodies (Special, Skylark) where supply and demand issues forced a substitution, and during the April 1968 production month in the wake of the assassination of Reverend Dr. Martin Luther King Jr. there were some work stoppages (e.g. strikes). A ribbed stainless steel panel was bolted to the rear taillight panel and a 'Concours By Chevrolet' emblem on the rear decklid. Other options included power windows and door locks. With the hardtop, a rare option is a horseshoe floor shifter with an integrated console (with bucket seats - sourced from the SS). These Concours options (ZK5, ZK6, and ZK7) should not be confused with the two Concours station wagons. At the time the ZK5, ZK6, and ZK7 Concours packages had similar equipment as the Caprice. Also new for 1968 was the elimination of the term "sedan" for the 2-door pillar body style. This was now called a coupe (or pillar coupe) while the 2-door hardtop remained a sport coupe. These coupe/sport coupe designations would continue into 1969. The Concours Estate Wagon was one of four distinct Chevelle wagon models. A one-year Nomad trim, called the Nomad Custom, was offered.

Regular Chevelle engines started with a  Turbo-Thrift six, the new  Turbo-Fire 307 V8, and a  version of the 327-cubic-inch V8. Manual transmission cars got GM's "Air Injection Reactor (A.I.R)" smog pump. New Federal safety-mandated equipment included side marker lights, as well as shoulder belts for outboard front seat occupants on cars built after December 1, 1967.

Design changes 1969–1972

1969 Chevelles were billed as "America's most popular mid-size car." They showed only minor changes for 1969, led by revised front-end styling. A single chrome bar connected quad headlights (which became a familiar Chevrolet trademark) with a revised front grille, now cast in ABS plastic, and a slotted bumper held the parking lights. Taillight lenses were larger and more vertical, flowing into the quarter panels. Smaller side marker lighting bezels were phased in (shared with the Camaro and using the lens assembly as the previous year). Front vent windows (hardtop and convertibles only) began to fade away now that Astro Ventilation (first introduced on the 1966 Buick Riviera which was used a year earlier on the Camaro and Caprice) was sending outside air into several Chevelle models. The Chevelle lineup slimmed down to Nomad, 300 Deluxe/Greenbrier, Malibu/Concours, and Concours Estate series, and the base 300 series was history. No longer a series of its own, the SS 396 turned into a $347.60 option package for any two-door model. That meant not just a convertible, sport coupe, or pickup, but even the pillared coupe and sport coupe in the 300 Deluxe series (except the base 300 Deluxe El Camino pickup). Fewer SS396-optioned 300 Deluxe coupes and sport coupes were built than their Malibu counterparts and they are solid gold for collectors. The Super Sport option included a 325-horsepower 396-cubic-inch V8 beneath a double-domed hood, along with a black-out grille displaying an SS emblem and a black rear panel. SS396s produced from this point on shared the same VIN prefix with the Malibu sport coupe (136), with the exception of the 300 Deluxe-based SS396s using (134), where the original build sheet and/or Protect-O-Plate (which is an aluminum tag included with the original sales invoice from Chevrolet dealers) can ID a genuine SS (especially for a numbers matching original which is unaltered); however, the VIN number alone cannot ID a genuine SS as in previous years. During the 1969 model year, a police package (RPO B07) was available on the Chevelle 300 Deluxe 4-door sedan where some were optioned with the RPO L35 (396) motor along with a boxed frame (also shared with fleet orders e.g. taxicabs and rental cars); at the time the police option was reintroduced since the 1964/65 model years (at the time midsize squads came with economy powertrain usually in the case of the Chevelle a third-generation Chevrolet inline-six. The 300 Deluxe squads was not a sales success since the market was dominated by rival manufacturer Chrysler Corporation where its B platform (and its full-sized sedans) outsold its competitors. Chevelle station wagons came in three levels: Concours, Nomad, and Greenbrier—the last a badge formerly used on the Corvair van. A new dual-action tailgate operated either in the traditional manner or as a panel-type door. Wagons stretched  overall versus  for coupes. Also, the Concours option package (ZK5, ZK6, and ZK7) from the previous year was continued. 
New round instrument pods replaced the former linear layout. Chevelle options included headlight washers, power windows and locks, and a rear defroster. Chevy's midsize production rose this year. About seven percent of all Malibus had a six-cylinder engine, while about 86,000 came with the SS 396 option. All 1969 Chevelles had a new locking steering column one year ahead of the Federal requirement, and headrests required for all cars sold in the U.S. after January 1, 1969.

In 1969 Chevrolet developed a steam powered concept vehicle, designated the SE 124 based on a Chevelle fitted it with a 50 hp Bresler steam engine in place of its gasoline engine. The Bresler was based on the Doble steam engine.

1970 Chevelle

In 1970, sheet metal revisions gave the bodies a more coke bottle styling, and interiors were also redesigned. The 1970 Chevelle and the 1970 Buick Skylark share the same roofline. The 1970 Chevelle came in Sport Coupe, Sport Sedan, convertible, four-door sedan, a couple of wagons, and coupé utility (the El Camino) body styles. Only three of these (Malibu sport coupe, Malibu convertible, and El Camino pickup) were available with a choice of one of two SS options; RPO Z25 with the SS 396 engine and RPO Z15 with the new  engine. The base model was now simply called Chevelle in lieu of the former base 300 Deluxe, and was only available as a Sport Coupe or four-door sedan. In Canada, the base series retained its 300 Deluxe name, with appropriate badging on each front fender just behind the front wheel well. The 300 Deluxe 2-door sedan was canceled and replaced by the base Chevelle Sport Coupe, a 2-door pillarless hardtop. The hardtop, convertible, and sedan received the upgraded sheet metal but the station wagons and El Camino retained the previous year's sheet metal panels (which went on for the next 2 model years). Station wagons were the entry-level Nomad, the Chevelle-level Greenbrier, the Malibu-level Concours, and an upscale Concours Estate. New options included power door locks and a stalk-mounted wiper control. Production was expanded to the GM Arlington Assembly plant in Arlington, Texas (where the Chevelle was assembled with its corporate siblings in this case the Oldsmobile Cutlass).

Engine choices ranged from the standard  six-cylinder and a 200-horsepower  V8 as well as one of two  V8s and a pair of  engines. RPO Z25 SS equipment option included one of these 402 cid engines, but was still marketed as a 396. The second 402 cid engine was available under RPO, rated at 330 hp with single exhaust, and was available in any V8 series except an SS optioned Malibu or El Camino. 1970 also saw the introduction of the  engine which was only available with the RPO Z15 SS Equipment option. There were 4,475 LS6 Chevelles produced.

The SS 396 Chevelle included a  Turbo-Jet 396 V8, special suspension, "power dome" hood, black-accented grille, resilient rear-bumper insert, and wide-oval tires on sport wheels. Though a  cowl induction version was available, few were sold in favor of the newly introduced 454 engine during late-1969 timeframe. The LS5  V8 produced  in standard form and a cowl induction version was also available. The LS6 produced a claimed 450 gross HP in solid-lifter, high-compression guise.

"You can make our tough one even tougher," the brochure explained, by adding Cowl Induction to either the SS 396 or the SS 454. Step on the gas, and a scoop opened "to shoot an extra breath of cool air into the engine air intake....like second wind to a distance runner." Neither functional hood lock pins nor hood and deck stripes were standard with either SS option, but were part of the optional ZL2 cowl induction hood option.

New design for 1971

Although the 1971 Chevelle retained the 1970 body, it was treated to new front-end and rear-end styling that included large Power-Beam single-unit headlights, a reworked grille and bumper, and integral park/signal/marker lights. The grille was widened and featured a bright horizontal bar that divided it into two sections. At the center of this bar was a large Chevy bowtie for Malibus, or a large "SS" emblem for the SS models. The grille on the Super Sport was painted flat black, other models got a silver-finished grille. Base Chevelles got a thinner, plain bar with no ornamentation. A small "Chevelle" nameplate was located in the lower-left corner of the grille. New dual round taillights were integral with the back bumper. Because SS models suffered heavy insurance surcharges, Chevrolet introduced the "Heavy Chevy" at midyear, which was based on the base Chevelle, and was available with any V8 engine except the 454, which was exclusive to SS models. The Heavy Chevy (RPO YF3) was only available with the base Chevelle sport coupe (13437) and was primarily a dress-up option and even it was limited to options available on the standard Chevelle sport coupe; vinyl carpeting, front bench seat, no center console shift, etc.

Chevrolet specifications for 1971 included both "gross" and "net" horsepower figures for all engines. The standard Chevelle SS engine was a two-barrel 350-cubic-inch V8 rated at 245 gross (165 net) horsepower. Optional was a four-barrel carbureted version of the 350 V8 rated at 275 gross (200 net with dual exhaust and 175 net with single exhaust) horsepower. The 402 cid big-block engine continued to be optional as the SS 396 but was only available in one horsepower rating, 300 gross (260 net) horsepower, and was not available with cowl induction. The base LS5 454 V8 produced 365 gross and 285 net horsepower, but cowl induction was available which produced more power because of the air induction and a louder exhaust system. The LS6 454 option, which was originally announced as a regular production option on the Chevelle SS for 1971, was dropped early in the model year and no official records indicate that any 1971 Chevelles were assembled with the LS6 engine.

For 1971, the SS option could be ordered with any optional V8 and became more of a dress-up option than a performance option. The SS option was reduced to one RPO code, RPO Z15, and was only available for the Chevelle Malibu. This RPO code required any optional engine and transmission available in the Chevelle lineup. Since the 307 V8 was the standard base V8 in 1971, it could not be ordered with the SS option; one had to order the LS3 402 or the LS5 454, or one of the two 350 V8 engines (L65 or L48 - which reintroduced the small block to the SS option for the first time since the 1965 model year for USA market Chevelles).

GM mandated all divisions design their engines to run on lower-octane regular, low-lead, or unleaded gasoline. To permit usage of the lower-octane fuels, all engines featured low compression ratios (9:1 and lower; well below the 10.25-11.25:1 range on high-performance engines of 1970 and earlier). This move reduced horsepower ratings on the big-block engines to 300 for the 402 cubic-inch V8 but the LS5 454 option got an "advertised" five-horsepower increase to 365.

Both 350 V8 engines, as well as the dual exhaust 402 cid V8 engine, were available without the SS option; only the LS5 454 V8 required the SS option. A single-exhaust version of the 402 cid engine existed in 1970 with 330 gross hp and in 1972 with 210 net hp. In 1971 the single exhaust version of the 402 cid engine produced 206 net hp, but only appeared in the full-size Chevrolet brochure.

1972 Chevelle

1972 Chevelles featured single-unit parking/side marker lights on their front fenders, outside of a revised twin-bar grille. All Malibus had concealed wipers. The SS equipment option requirements remained the same as those in 1971, any optional V8. The 1972 Chevelle series had wide enough appeal to qualify as America's second-best-selling car. Base versions again included a four-model wagon series. Upscale versions were Malibus including the convertible models. More than 24,000 Malibu Sport Sedans were built, with a standard 307-cubic-inch V8 rated at 130 (net) horsepower. This 4-door hardtop used the same body as the 1968-71 models, and although it was attractive, it was the least popular body style in the lineup. It was not available with the overhead-valve "Turbo-Thrift" six-cylinder engine. With that V8, the Malibu Sport Coupe was the top seller by far starting at $2,923. The six-cylinder version ran $90 less. Powertrain options included the 175-horsepower 350-cubic-inch V8 and 240-horsepower 402-cubic-inch (still known as a 396), as well as a 454 that produced  under the net rating system. Chevelles sold in California were not available with the 307 V8, but had a 350-cubic-inch engine. Through the 1970s, California cars often had different powertrains than those marketed in states with less-stringent emissions regulations.

The 1972 Chevelle SS had a top engine rated at 270 net hp (201 kW) conforming with GM's decree that all engines were to be rated at their net engine ratings. All other engines on the SS roster were unchanged from 1971. 1972 was the last year for the cowl induction option for the 454 cid engine and was not even mentioned in the 1972 Chevelle brochure.

Chevelle wagons measured  shorter than full-size wagons and weighed about half a ton less, but sold much slower. Model-year output totaled 49,352 Chevelles and 290,008 Malibus—plus 54,335 station wagons.

The Yenko Chevelles
Retired Corvair and Corvette race car driver Don Yenko (a Pittsburgh-area Chevrolet dealer) developed his own line of signature Chevelles, Camaros and Novas, marketed as Yenko Super Cars. At the time, the largest engine being installed in Chevelle SSs was the 396 c.i.d. V8. A few other dealers ordered the package Yenko created and sold them as their own supercars. (Nickey, Berger, Scuncio, etc.)

Third generation (1973–1977)

Overview

The most extensive redesign in its 10-year history marked the 1973 Chevelle. Due to concern over proposed Federal rollover standards, convertible and 4-door hardtop models were discontinued, while the 2-door hardtop was replaced by a pillared coupe—named "Colonnade Hardtop". This body style featured a semi-fastback roofline, frameless door glass, and fixed, styled "B" pillars, structurally strong enough to contribute to occupant safety of a roll-over type accident. This move was somewhat controversial with the buying public as hardtops had been a staple of American cars for over 20 years. However, the Colonnade models became a sales success. The Monte Carlo coupe was the biggest seller of the Chevrolet A-body line (actually designated A-Special), although the bread-and-butter coupes, sedans, and station wagons also sold well. Distinctive rear quarter glass on 2-door coupes and new side windows with styled center pillars were featured on 4-door models. Rear windows on coupes no longer opened. In addition to the new roofline, front and rear ends looked markedly different this year as 1973 was the year of the federally mandated  front bumper, adding to the car's length. Additional new body features were an acoustical double-panel roof, tighter-fitting glass, and flush-style outside door handles. The station wagon, available in 6- or 9-passenger seating, featured a new counterbalanced liftgate which allowed for easier entry and loading up to 85 cubic feet.

Plans to release the updated A-body lineup was scheduled for the 1972 model year but a strike that occurred at some GM assembly plants delayed the release for a full model year, eventually extending the lifecycle of the 1968-era generation; the redesigned A-bodies were designed in a studio where it had more of a European influence - at the time of development John Z. DeLorean was the chairman at the Chevrolet division where he delayed some product releases and extending the lifecycle of some of its products; the redesigned A-bodies had some styling cues lifted from the concurrent second-generation F-bodies - the front suspension was integrated into the A-body redesign with output from respective GM divisions (each division had its own sheet metal design).

1973 models also introduced molded full foam front and rear seat construction, a flow-through power ventilation system, an inside hood release, a larger 22-gallon fuel tank, and "flush and dry" rocker panels introduced first on the redesigned 1971 full-size Chevrolets. Another structural improvement was side-impact guard beams in the doors, as required by new Federal Motor Vehicle Safety Standards. New options included swivel bucket seats with console for coupes and Turbine I steel-backed urethane wheels. A power moonroof was an option in 1973-75. Interior roominess of the 1973 Chevelle was improved, particularly in the rear. Rear seat legroom was up  in sedans. Still another benefit of the new body designs was greatly improved visibility, up 25% in coupes and wagons, and 35% in sedans. The unusually thin windshield pillars also contributed to much better visibility.

New chassis
The chassis design was new, with a sturdier perimeter frame, revised chassis/body mounts, larger 8½ inch rear axle, wider 6-inch wheel rim width, revised rear control arm bushings, increased front and rear suspension travel, adjusted shock absorber location, and revised front suspension geometry - The left wheel was adjusted to have slightly more positive camber than the right which resulted in more uniform and stable steering feel on high-crown road surfaces while maintaining freeway stability. Clearances for spring travel were also revised; the coil springs at each wheel were computer-selected to match the individual car's weight. Front disc brakes were now standard on all '73 Chevelles. John Z. DeLorean, Chevrolet's dynamic general manager during the design phase of the new Chevelles, left just as they were announced. He departed in late September 1972 to start a brief period as vice president of General Motors's Car and Truck Group. Critics compared the GM Colonnade line favorably to Ford and Chrysler intermediates.

Hardened engine valve seats and hydraulic camshafts made these engines reliable and allowed them to accept the increasingly popular unleaded regular gasoline. The 3-speed manual transmission was standard; a 4-speed manual and Turbo Hydra-Matic 3-speed automatic were optional. Crossflow radiators and coolant reservoirs that prevented air from entering the system prevented overheating.

Revised model lineup

Malibu and the newly named Deluxe series base model featured the new  bumper system with a large chrome front bumper and a chrome rear bumper. Malibu series interiors included cloth and vinyl or all vinyl seat trim and deep-twist carpeting.
Deluxe series interiors featured cloth and vinyl or knit vinyl seat trim. Floor coverings were color-keyed in vinyl-coated rubber.
The SS was now a trim option limited to the mid-level Malibu series. It was possible to order an SS station wagon this year - with the option of a 454-cubic-inch V8 engine, but the mix of sport and utilitarian wagon virtues would last only a single season. Included was a black grill with SS emblem, lower bodyside and wheel opening striping, bright roof drip moldings, color-keyed dual sport mirrors, black taillight bezels, SS fender and rear panel emblems, special front and rear stabilizer bars, 14x7-inch rally wheels, 70-series raised white lettered tires, special instrumentation, and SS interior emblems.
The SS option required an available 350 or 454 V8 with 4-speed or Turbo Hydra-Matic transmission.

Chevrolet honored California beach resorts once again by naming the top Chevelle series Laguna with the Malibu taking the middle spot while the base series was called simply Deluxe. In addition to the standard 350 2 barrel V8, Laguna models featured specific front and rear styling including a body-colored urethane front end concealing the new 5 mph bumper system. On minor impact the urethane nose cone, backed up by shock-absorbing cylinders, deflects and rebounds; Laguna models also featured a specific diecast chrome grille with bowtie emblem, a body-colored (steel) rear bumper, front and rear bumper rub strips, bright roof drip moldings, bright wheel opening moldings, chrome taillight bezels, full wheel covers, and Laguna fender nameplates. Two Laguna station wagons were introduced, including a Laguna Estate. Laguna interiors were pattern cloth and vinyl or optional breathable all-vinyl upholstery, distinctive door trim with map pockets, deep-twist carpeting, woodgrain vinyl accents, and Laguna nameplates.

Chevelle sales remained strong: 327,631 of them in the 1973 model year, plus 59,108 station wagons. The more upmarket Malibu continued to sell best by a wide margin and many Chevelles went to the fleet market, but the costlier Laguna coupe and sedan made a respectable showing, with 56,036 going to customers. Super Sport options were on 28,647 Chevelles of which 2,500 had the 454-cubic-inch engine. The SS option was dropped at the end of the model year.

Changes 1974–1977

Annual facelifts continued. The 1974 model featured new chrome grilles made of die-cast steel, and single rectangular tail lights replaced the dual round items on all coupes and sedans. More massive rear bumpers were also added, in accordance with stricter US Federal standards for 1974 cars.

The Laguna, which had been Chevelle's top-of-the-line model in 1973, became the sporty Laguna Type S-3 and was only available as a coupe. It combined Laguna luxury with the upgraded handling of the SS, which it replaced. It also included GR70-15 radial tires. The new Laguna S-3 featured the urethane front end with a revised grille as well as new front lamps and taillights. The rear bumper on the Laguna S-3 was chrome-plated rather than painted body color as on the 1973 car. Standard equipment included a console, a vinyl roof, opera-type vertical rear quarter windows which could be covered with optional horizontal ribs; bodyside striping, Laguna S-3 badging, rally wheels, a 4-spoke steering wheel, firmer springs and shock absorbers, a front anti-roll bar, and HR70x15 radial tires on rally wheels. Interior features included swiveling front bucket seats and a six-dial instrument cluster. Production totaled 15,792 cars. The standard engine was  producing  with a 2-barrel carburetor, with options for a  2-barrel or  4-barrel  V8, and a   V8, except in California where a  350 four-barrel V8 was standard and the 400 and 454 engines were optional. The 454 was available with GM's THM-400 automatic or Muncie 4-speed manual transmission. Unitized 3-point seat belts were introduced as on all Chevrolet models.

The upscale luxury trim level for 1974 was the new Malibu Classic, offered in sedan, coupe, and station wagon models. Unlike the 1973 Laguna, the Malibu Classic used the same front end and chrome bumper as the lesser models, and had smaller vertical opera windows and a spring-loaded hood ornament. Early-production 1974 Classic coupes required the vinyl roof option; apparently inserts were used to cover part of the big rear quarter window. Later-built cars were available with a standard painted roof that included the smaller opera window. This configuration was continued through the end of Chevelle production in 1977. Inside, the Malibu Classic interiors had notchback bench seats upholstered in cloth or vinyl, carpeted door panels, and simulated woodgrain instrument panel trim. Optional on Malibu Classic coupes were swiveling bucket seats in cloth or vinyl. The base Deluxe series was dropped for 1974, making the Malibu the base model. Base engines were the  straight-six engine and the 350 V8.

For 1975, Front and rear changes included a vertical grid-patterned grille and new bright trim around the headlights. Rectangular taillights were flush with the body surface, connected by a brushed chrome panel. Malibu Classic coupes had distinctive opera windows. Landau coupes came with a vinyl roof, full-wheel covers, whitewall tires, color-keyed body striping, and dual sport mirrors. Engines ranged from the standard 250 six and 350/2-barrel V8 to options of 400 and 454-cubic-inch size, the last with a 235-horsepower rating. Variable-ratio power steering was now standard with V8 models, and all 1975 models came with steel-belted radial tires and a catalytic converter. A new "Chevrolet Efficiency System" included GM's new High energy ignition (HEI) for longer tune-up intervals and more complete combustion. Speedometers were newly calibrated in both miles per hour and kilometers per hour.

The Laguna Type S-3 was delayed until January 1975. It now had a slanted, urethane-covered aero-style nose designed for NASCAR, louvered quarter windows, and could be ordered with a vinyl half-roof. The 454 engine option was available for the first half of the model year after which the 400 engine became the top engine. Options included an Econominder gauge package.

The 1976 Malibu Classic received a crosshatch grille flanked by two stacked rectangular sealed-beam headlamps, while lesser models had a waterfall grille and continued with the previous single round lamps. An "Econominder" gauge package was optional. In its third and final year, the 1976 Laguna Type S-3 was little changed. It again featured quarter window louvers and a sloped, body-color urethane front end. Lagunas shared their round-gauge instrument panel with the Chevrolet Monte Carlo and could be ordered with a four-spoke sport steering wheel as well as swivel front bucket seats and a center console. Lesser models had a dashboard and a linear-readout speedometer. Production of the Laguna edged up to 9,100 cars.

The 1977 Chevelles featured new grilles. The lineup consisted of Malibu and Malibu Classic models in coupe, sedan, and station wagon body styles. Estate Wagons and the Laguna Type S-3 were gone. Malibu Classics, again the top model, switched to a vertical grille pattern and six-section taillights but kept their twin stacked headlights and stand-up hood ornament. Malibu grilles changed little. Fewer engine selections were available though the engines that remained gained a few horses. Malibu Classics had a luxurious cloth/vinyl split-bench front seat, color-keyed steering wheel, and woodgrain-accented instrument panel. Malibu options included an Exterior Decor group, tinted glass, and full wheel covers. A total of 37,215 Malibu Classic Landau coupes were produced, as opposed to 73,739 Malibu Classic coupes and 28,793 Malibu coupes. In four-door sedan form, too, the Malibu Classics outsold base models by a substantial margin.

A Chevelle SE (special edition) was available and provided front and rear spoilers, turbine II wheels, F60-15 tires, special graphics and decals, quarter window trim, front and rear sway bars, sport suspension, and a deluxe interior. Three colors were available. 50 of these cars were built.

The 1977 models were the last to bear the Chevelle name; with the all-new 1978 models, Malibu became the basic name for Chevrolet's midsize cars. In Mexico, the base version of the new-for-1978 Malibu used the Chevelle name through 1981.

Reviews

Speed and Supercar magazine said in a June 1974 "Street Test": "Chevy gets it right on." "Enough is plenty, that's how we feel about the 350 Laguna. "... We couldn't pass up the opportunity to tell you what a groovy all around car it is even if it can't smoke the quarter-mile in 13 seconds. And what car in '73 can." "It's not overpowering but it's enough - and so comfortable that the editor bought the car." "The Laguna is the type of car you want to own for fast, comfortable transportation in quiet luxury."

NASCAR

The third-generation Chevelle was an extensively used body style in NASCAR competition from 1973 through 1977. The Chevelle Laguna in particular was successful allowing Cale Yarborough to win 34 races and earn the first two of three consecutive Grand National championships. Considered a limited edition model by NASCAR, the Laguna S-3 was ineligible for competition following the 1977 season.

October 21, 1973: American 500-Benny Parsons pits for repairs after an early crash. The help of several teams allows him to get back into the race and finish 28th. Parsons and his Chevelle hold on to win the NASCAR Winston Cup Grand National championship. Parsons took the points lead with a third-place finish at Talladega Speedway in early May and never gave up the lead. He held off a late rally by Cale Yarborough to win by only 67.15 points.

August 1976: Cale Yarborough drove his #11 Junior Johnson/Holly Farms Chevelle to the 1976 NASCAR Winston Cup Grand National championship. Yarborough won nine races along the way to the first of three consecutive titles. He finished last in the Daytona 500, but assumed command of the points chase in August. Yarborough beat Richard Petty by 195 points.

February 20, 1977: Daytona 500-Cale Yarborough Chevelle pulls away from Benny Parsons Chevelle in the final laps to win in his second Daytona 500. Cale Yarborough was running at the finish in all 30 NASCAR Winston Cup races as he dominated the 1977 season to wrap up his second consecutive title. Yarborough won nine races in 30 starts in his #11 Chevelle and finished 386 points ahead of runner-up Richard Petty.

Gallery

See also
Chevrolet Chevelle Laguna
Chevrolet Malibu
GM A platform (1936)
Chevrolet El Camino

References

External links

Chevrolet Chevelle SS - MuscleCarClub.com
1964–1972 Chevelle Reference Information - ChevelleStuff.net
Chevrolet Chevelle at The Crittenden Automotive Library (media, stories & recalls)

Chevelle
Muscle cars
Mid-size cars
Rear-wheel-drive vehicles
Convertibles
Coupés
Station wagons
Cars introduced in 1964
1970s cars